Llangynidr is a village, community and electoral ward in Powys, Wales, about  west of Crickhowell and  south-east of Brecon.  The River Usk flows through the village as does the Monmouthshire and Brecon Canal. It is in the historic county of Brecknockshire.

The village
The village is located four miles west of Crickhowell and nine miles southeast of Brecon, beside the River Usk and the Monmouthshire and Brecon Canal. It is situated on the B4558 just to the south of where this road diverges from the A40 trunk road. The stone bridge across the river dates from approximately 1700 and is a Grade I listed building.  The canal has five locks and an aqueduct in the vicinity of the village.

The village is notionally divided into Upper and Lower Llangynidr.  The remains of what may be a medieval reeve's house have been discovered in the course of archaeological excavations in the centre of the village. The village has two public houses, a village shop and a primary school.

History
Sir William Herbert, Knight of Raglan Castle, was granted the manors of Tretower Castle and Crickhowell just after the accession of Edward IV in 1442. At that time this village was part of the manor of Tretower.

The land was then in the ownership of the Earls of Worcester until the nineteenth and early twentieth century when much of Llangynidr was part of the Glanusk Park estate.

On the moors to the southeast of the village lies the Chartist Cave, the name of which derives from 1839 when Chartist rebels used the cave to stockpile weapons in advance of their march on Newport. There is a plaque at the entrance of the cave commemorating their actions.

Until the 20th century, the principal language in Llangynidr was Welsh. For example, in his 1893 book 'Wales and her language', John E Southall, reports that over 60% of the population of Crickhowell and Llangynidr spoke welsh, although the town was only a few miles from more anglicised Abergavenny. Welsh services persisted in at least one chapel in Llangynidr into the 1970s.

References

External links

Photos of Llangynidr and surrounding area on geograph
Old photos of Llangynidr
Genuki on Llangynidr with links
Brecon Beacons Park Society on Llangynidr

Further reading
Shadows in a Landscape (Llangynidr Local History Society, 2000)
Stories Behind the Stone Cross (Llangynidr Local History Society, 2014)

Villages in Powys
Brecon Beacons
River Usk